Norman Case (1 September 1925 – 1973) was an English professional footballer who played as a forward for Sunderland.

References

1925 births
1973 deaths
Sportspeople from Prescot
English footballers
Association football forwards
Ards F.C. players
Sheffield United F.C. players
Leyton Orient F.C. players
Rochdale A.F.C. players
Sunderland A.F.C. players
Watford F.C. players
Yeovil Town F.C. players
Cheltenham Town F.C. players
Canterbury City F.C. players
English Football League players